George Robert Parsons (19 May 1911 – 12 August 1996) was a Canadian sailor who competed in the 1956 Summer Olympics. He was born, and died in Vancouver.

References

1911 births
1996 deaths
Sportspeople from Vancouver
Canadian male sailors (sport)
Olympic sailors of Canada
Sailors at the 1956 Summer Olympics – Star